Genoni is a comune (municipality) in the Province of South Sardinia in the Italian region Sardinia, located about  north of Cagliari and about  southeast of Oristano.  
Genoni borders the following municipalities: Albagiara, Assolo, Genuri, Gesturi, Gonnosnò, Laconi, Nuragus, Nureci, Setzu, Sini.

References

Cities and towns in Sardinia